Horst Bertl (24 March 1947 – 6 February 2022) was a German footballer who played as a midfielder.

Playing career
In 1969, Bertl began his career with TuS Bremerhaven 93 before transferring to Bundesliga club Hannover 96 in 1970.  Earning the nickname "Big Turtle", he went on to play two seasons with Hannover and moved to Borussia Dortmund where he also spent two seasons.  In 1974, Bertl signed with Hamburger SV.  He played five seasons with Hamburg before moving to the United States and signing with the Houston Hurricane of the North American Soccer League in 1979.  The Hurricane folded after the 1980 season and Bertl spent two seasons with the Memphis Americans of the Major Indoor Soccer League.

Managerial career
In 1981, the Memphis Americans of MISL signed Bertl as head coach.  He compiled a 39–53 record over two seasons as a player-coach.  In 1984, Bertl became a coach with the Comets Soccer Club in Dallas, Texas.  In 2012, MLS's FC Dallas Youth acquired the Comets Soccer Club, adding Bertl to its program as well.  In 1993, he coached the Dallas Rockets to the USISL playoffs.

Bertl served as player agent for Paul Caligiuri, Eric Eichmann, Braeden Cloutier and Brian McBride.

Personal life and death
Bertl died on 6 February 2022, at the age of 74.

Honours
Hamburger SV
 UEFA Cup Winners' Cup: 1976–77
 Bundesliga: 1978–79
 DFB-Pokal: 1975–76

References

External links
 
 NASL/MISL stats

1947 births
2022 deaths
German footballers
Association football midfielders
Bundesliga players
Hannover 96 players
Borussia Dortmund players
Hamburger SV players
Houston Hurricane players
Major Indoor Soccer League (1978–1992) players
Memphis Americans players
North American Soccer League (1968–1984) players
German sports agents
Association football agents
German football managers
Major Indoor Soccer League (1978–1992) coaches
USISL coaches
FC Dallas non-playing staff
Sportspeople from Bremerhaven
German expatriate footballers
German expatriate sportspeople in the United States
Expatriate soccer players in the United States
Footballers from Bremen (state)